Idris is a Welsh and Arabic given name (usually masculine), also given as surname. The two names are spelled identically, but are unrelated.

This indicates that the name may well have been used in Wales before his final stand in 632.

Arabic (also transliterated Idrees): Idris, the Islamic prophet mentioned in the Qur'an, usually identified with Enoch in the Bible. The original meaning may be "interpreter." The name Idris means studious, smart, or to learn in Arabic. The prophet Idris in the Islamic religion was a tailor and is believed to be the first person to write.

People with the name

Given name
 Idriss Aberkane (born 1986), French professor, author, and entrepreneur of Algerian decent
 Idris Bell (1879–1967), British museum curator, papyrologist and scholar of Welsh literature
 Idris Bitlisi (born c. 1450s), Kurdish religious scholar and Ottoman administrator
 Idris Cox (1899–1989), Welsh communist activist and newspaper editor
 Idris Davies, (1905–1953), Welsh poet 
 Idris Charles, (1947–2021), Welsh language comedian, actor, TV presenter and writer
 Idris Elba, OBE (born 1972), English actor, writer, producer, musician, DJ, rapper, singer and boxer
 Idris Foster (1911–1984), Welsh scholar
 Idris Gawr, "Idris the Giant" (c. 560–c. 632), a king of Meirionnydd in early medieval Wales, traditionally also an astronomer
 İdris Güllüce (born 1950), Turkish civil engineer, politician and government minister
 Idris Hopkins (1910–1994), Welsh footballer
 Idris Jones (1900–1971), Welsh industrial chemist and rugby union player
 Idris Jones (born 1943), English-born Anglican bishop of the Scottish Episcopal Church
 Idris Abdul Karim (born 1976), Malaysian footballer
 Idris Khattak, Pakistani human rights activist who has been missing since 2019
 İdris Küçükömer (1925–1987), Turkish academic, philosopher and economist
 Idris Lewis (1889–1952), Welsh conductor and composer
 Idris Miles (1908–1983), Welsh footballer
 Idris Muhammad (born 1939), American jazz drummer
 Idris Phillips (1958–2022), American musician
 Idris Rahman (born 1976), English musician
 İdris Naim Şahin (born 1956), Turkish politician
 Idris Sardi (1938-2013), Indonesian violinist
 Idris Seabright, pseudonym of American author Margaret St. Clair (1911–1995)
 Idries Shah or Idris Shah (1926–1996), author and teacher in the Sufi tradition
 Idris Towill (1909–1988), Welsh dual-code rugby player
 Idris Waziri, Nigerian politician
 Idris Galcia Welsh, birthname of Canadian-American explorer, author, filmmaker and aviator Aloha Wanderwell (1906–1996)
 Idris Williams (1836–1894), Welsh educationalist, Congregationalist and councillor
 Idris Jamma' (1922 – 1980), Sudanese poet.

Royal and political titles
 Idris I of Morocco, the first ruler and founder of the Idrisid Dynasty of Morocco.
 Idris II of Morocco, the son of Idris I
 Idris of Libya (1889–1983), first and only king of Libya
 Idris Shah II of Perak (1924–1984), sultan of Perak

Nickname
 Joni Hendrawan or Idris, Indonesian member of Jemaah Islamiyah
 Howell Idris (1842–1925) Welsh politician born Thomas Howell Williams. (Also Idris, a brand of Ginger beer, originally made by Howell Idris' company)

Surname

 Alimcan Idris (1887-1959), Tatar theologian
 Damson Idris (born 1991), English actor
 Denise Idris Jones (1950–2020), Welsh Labour politician
 Jamal Idris (born 1990), Australian professional rugby league footballer
 Kamil Idris, Sudanese international civil servant
 Salim Idris (b. 1957), Syrian general
 Suhayl Idris (1923–2008), Lebanese novelist, short-story writer, journalist, and translator
 Yusuf Idris (1927–1991), Egyptian writer
 S. M. Mohamed Idris (1926-2019), Malaysian environmental diplomat

Fictional characters
 Idris, a.k.a. Red Idris, a main character in Jennifer Maiden's third novel in the Play With Knives series, Play With Knives: Three: George and Clare and the Grey Hat Hacker'
 Idris, the TARDIS personified in the Doctor Who episode "The Doctor's Wife"
 Idris, in Mary Shelley's novel The Last Man Idris the Dragon, a Welsh dragon in the animated series Ivor the Engine Idris, an assassin in the mobile MOBA game Vainglory''

See also
 Driss
 Idris (disambiguation)
 Idrisi (surname)
 Idriss
 Idrissa

References

Arabic masculine given names
Welsh masculine given names